TPDC may refer to:

Tai Po District Council, the district council for the Tai Po District in Hong Kong
Tanzania Petroleum Development Corporation, the national oil company of Tanzania